Joseph A. "Old Hoss" Ardner (February 27, 1858 – September 15, 1935) was a second baseman in Major League Baseball (MLB).

He was buried at Woodland Cemetery in Cleveland.

Sources

1858 births
1935 deaths
19th-century baseball players
Baseball players from Ohio
Major League Baseball second basemen
Cleveland Spiders players
Cleveland Blues (NL) players
People from Mount Vernon, Ohio
Altoona (minor league baseball) players
Reading Actives players
Springfield, Ohio (minor league baseball) players
Scranton Indians players
Oswego Starchboxes players
Topeka (minor league baseball) players
Kansas City Blues (baseball) players
St. Joseph Clay Eaters players
Tacoma (minor league baseball) players
Jamestown (minor league baseball) players
Atlanta Firecrackers players
Johnstown Terrors players
Akron Summits players
Sharon Ironmongers players
Schenectady Dorpians players
Youngstown Puddlers players
Burials at Woodland Cemetery (Cleveland)